Squarcialupi may refer to one of two items:

 Antonio Squarcialupi, Florentine organist and composer to Lorenzo de' Medici
 The Squarcialupi codex, the richest source of Italian 14th century music, owned by Antonio Squarcialupi